Haalderen is a village in the Netherlands, in the province of Gelderland. The village is located in the Betuwe region, and belongs to the municipality of Lingewaard. Haalderen is situated along the rivers Waal and Linge. It has a population of 2,061 (1 January 2020).

Physical geography 
The territory of Haalderen is mainly located on river deposits. In the southwest of Haalderen there are river forelands of the Waal. Due to several levee breaches in the past, tree kolk lakes (named Kleine Kolk Grote Kolk and Groene Kolk) are still clearly visible in the current landscape of Haalderen. There is also a kolk lake in the border area of Haalderen and Bemmel (named Ronduit). Typical herbs that grow along the kolks of Haalderen are Inula britannica and Limosella aquatica.

Education 
The village has one primary school: IKC De Wieling. The school has about 250 pupils.

Local sights 
Local places of interest in Haalderen include:
 OLV van Zeven Smartenkerk - The church of the village (a Catholic church)
 Hertenkamp Haalderen - A small deer park near the church, in the middle of the village
 Kleine Kolk, Grote Kolk and Groene Kolk - The three main kolk lakes of Haalderen (remnants of the levee failures)
 Haalders Bos - A small woodlot in the southwest of the village

Photo gallery

References 

Populated places in Gelderland
Lingewaard